Dominic Manucy (December 20, 1823  – December 7, 1885) was an American prelate of the Catholic Church. He served as the first Vicar Apostolic of Brownsville (later the Diocese of Corpus Christi) from 1874 until his death in 1885, and also served as the third Bishop of Mobile for a few months in 1884.

Biography

Early life and ministry
Manucy was born on December 20, 1823 in St. Augustine, Florida, the son of Pedro Manucy and Maria Lorenzo. His grandfather, Josef Manucy, came to Florida from the island of Menorca as an indentured servant at Andrew Turnbull's settlement in New Smyrna. Conditions were so abysmal at New Smyrna that the settlers rebelled against Turnbull and moved to St. Augustine. One of Josef's other descendants was historian Albert Manucy (1910-1997).

Manucy was raised with his second cousin, Anthony Dominic Pellicer, and he and Pellicer studied for the priesthood together at Spring Hill College in Mobile, Alabama. They were both ordained by Bishop Michael Portier on August 15, 1850. After his ordination, he worked at the Florida missions in Warrington and Apalachicola. He then returned to Mobile, being appointed assistant pastor of Immaculate Conception Cathedral (1855) and later pastor of St. Vincent's Church (1861). In 1865 he succeeded Pellicer as pastor of St. Peter's Church in Montgomery.

Bishop
On September 18, 1874, Manucy was appointed the first Vicar Apostolic of Brownsville, Texas, and titular bishop of Dulma by Pope Pius IX. At the same time, Pellicer was also assigned to Texas as the first Bishop of San Antonio. Just as they were ordained priests together, Manucy and his cousin both received their episcopal consecration on December 8, 1874 from Archbishop Napoléon-Joseph Perché at the cathedral in Mobile.

Manucy was formally installed in Brownsville on February 11, 1875. The new vicariate covered the territory between the Nueces River and the Rio Grande, and contained a Catholic population of about 40,000 people being served by the Oblate Fathers. Manucy set up his residence in Corpus Christi, where he oversaw the construction of a new building for St. Patrick's Church. During his tenure, he ordained five priests for the vicariate; established three convents and recruited religious orders like the Sisters of the Incarnate Word; and built nine churches, with three more under construction by the end of his tenure.

On January 18, 1884, Manucy was named Bishop of Mobile by Pope Leo XIII, while remaining in charge of the vicariate until the appointment of a successor. He returned to Mobile, where he had been ordained a priest and bishop, and was installed on March 30, 1884. However, only a few months later, his health began to decline. He submitted his resignation to the Vatican in the summer of 1884 but was rejected by Cardinal Giovanni Simeoni; he asked again and this time his resignation was accepted on September 27, 1884. He attended the third Plenary Council of Baltimore from November to December that year.

Manucy was re-appointed Vicar Apostolic of Brownsville on February 7, 1885, with the titular see of Maronea. His illness prevented him from returning to Texas and he remained in Mobile, where he died on December 4, 1885 at age 61. He is buried in the crypt of Immaculate Conception Cathedral in Mobile.

Episcopal succession

References

External links

 Catholic Encyclopedia bio
 
 Roman Catholic Archdiocese of Mobile 
 Roman Catholic Diocese of Corpus Christi bio
 Roman Catholic Diocese of Corpus Christi Home Page

1828 births
1885 deaths
People from Corpus Christi, Texas
People from St. Augustine, Florida
Catholics from Texas
Catholics from Florida
Bishops of Duvno
Roman Catholic bishops of Mobile
Bishops appointed by Pope Pius IX
Bishops appointed by Pope Leo XIII
19th-century Roman Catholic bishops in the United States